Ian Leslie Stewart Watson (born Carlton, Nottinghamshire 17 September 1950) was Archdeacon of Coventry from 2007 until 2012. He married Denise (née Macpherson) in 1972 and has two children, Hannah (1974) and Adam (1975).

He was an Officer in the Royal Marines from 1969 to 1979. He studied for ordination at Wycliffe Hall, Oxford and was priested in 1981. After a curacy at St Andrew, Plymouth he was Vicar of Matchborough from 1985 to 1989. He was Team Rector of Woodley, Berkshire from 1989 to 1995; the Anglican Chaplain in Amsterdam from 1995 to 2001; and Chief Executive of the Intercontinental Church Society from 2001 until his appointment as Archdeacon. He was made Archdeacon Emeritus of Coventry in 2012 and Canon Emeritus of Gibraltar in 2007.

A keen cricketer, he now plays and coaches wheelchair basketball at National League level (after the amputation of his left leg in 2014 as the result of a war injury incurred in Northern Ireland in 1973). He is currently the Chairman of the Society for the Relief of Poor Clergy  and the Steelers Wheelers Sports ' Club. Additionally, he is the President of the Welton British Legion. A former member of the Plymouth Lifeboat Crew he received an award for his part in the rescue of the crew of the Saint Simeon trawler in 1985.

References

1950 births
Living people
People from Carlton, Nottinghamshire
20th-century English Anglican priests
21st-century English Anglican priests
Alumni of Wycliffe Hall, Oxford
Royal Marines officers
Archdeacons of Coventry